T-symmetry or time reversal symmetry is the theoretical symmetry of physical laws under the transformation of time reversal,

Since the second law of thermodynamics states that entropy increases as time flows toward the future, in general, the macroscopic universe does not show symmetry under time reversal. In other words, time is said to be non-symmetric, or asymmetric, except for special equilibrium states when the second law of thermodynamics predicts the time symmetry to hold. However, quantum noninvasive measurements are predicted to violate time symmetry even in equilibrium, contrary to their classical counterparts, although this has not yet been experimentally confirmed.

Time asymmetries generally are caused by one of three categories:
 intrinsic to the dynamic physical law (e.g., for the weak force)
 due to the initial conditions of the universe (e.g., for the second law of thermodynamics)
 due to measurements (e.g., for the noninvasive measurements)

Macroscopic phenomena

The second law of thermodynamics

Daily experience shows that T-symmetry does not hold for the behavior of bulk materials. Of these macroscopic laws, most notable is the second law of thermodynamics. Many other phenomena, such as the relative motion of bodies with friction, or viscous motion of fluids, reduce to this, because the underlying mechanism is the dissipation of usable energy (for example, kinetic energy) into heat.

The question of whether this time-asymmetric dissipation is really inevitable has been considered by many physicists, often in the context of Maxwell's demon. The name comes from a thought experiment described by James Clerk Maxwell in which a microscopic demon guards a gate between two halves of a room. It only lets slow molecules into one half, only fast ones into the other. By eventually making one side of the room cooler than before and the other hotter, it seems to reduce the entropy of the room, and reverse the arrow of time. Many analyses have been made of this; all show that when the entropy of room and demon are taken together, this total entropy does increase. Modern analyses of this problem have taken into account Claude E. Shannon's relation between entropy and information. Many interesting results in modern computing are closely related to this problem — reversible computing, quantum computing and physical limits to computing, are examples. These seemingly metaphysical questions are today, in these ways, slowly being converted into hypotheses of the physical sciences.

The current consensus hinges upon the Boltzmann–Shannon identification of the logarithm of phase space volume with the negative of Shannon information, and hence to entropy. In this notion, a fixed initial state of a macroscopic system corresponds to relatively low entropy because the coordinates of the molecules of the body are constrained. As the system evolves in the presence of dissipation, the molecular coordinates can move into larger volumes of phase space, becoming more uncertain, and thus leading to increase in entropy.

Big Bang
One resolution to irreversibility is to say that the constant increase of entropy we observe happens only because of the initial state of our universe. Other possible states of the universe (for example, a universe at heat death equilibrium) would actually result in no increase of entropy. In this view, the apparent T-asymmetry of our universe is a problem in cosmology:  why did the universe start with a low entropy? This view, supported by cosmological observation (such as the isotropy of the Cosmic Microwave Background) connect this problem to the question of initial conditions of the universe.

Black holes
The laws of gravity seem to be time reversal invariant in classical mechanics; however, specific solutions need not be.

An object can cross through the event horizon of a black hole from the outside, and then fall rapidly to the central region where our understanding of physics breaks down. Since within a black hole the forward light-cone is directed towards the center and the backward light-cone is directed outward, it is not even possible to define time-reversal in the usual manner. The only way anything can escape from a black hole is as Hawking radiation.

The time reversal of a black hole would be a hypothetical object known as a white hole. From the outside they appear similar. While a black hole has a beginning and is inescapable, a white hole has an ending and cannot be entered. The forward light-cones of a white hole are directed outward; and its backward light-cones are directed towards the center.

The event horizon of a black hole may be thought of as a surface moving outward at the local speed of light and is just on the edge between escaping and falling back. The event horizon of a white hole is a surface moving inward at the local speed of light and is just on the edge between being swept outward and succeeding in reaching the center. They are two different kinds of horizons—the horizon of a white hole is like the horizon of a black hole turned inside-out.

The modern view of black hole irreversibility is to relate it to the second law of thermodynamics, since black holes are viewed as thermodynamic objects. For example, according to the gauge–gravity duality conjecture, all microscopic processes in a black hole are reversible, and only the collective behavior is irreversible, as in any other macroscopic, thermal system.

Kinetic consequences: detailed balance and Onsager reciprocal relations

In physical and chemical kinetics, T-symmetry of the mechanical microscopic equations implies two important laws: the principle of detailed balance and the Onsager reciprocal relations. T-symmetry of the microscopic description together with its kinetic consequences are called microscopic reversibility.

Effect of time reversal on some variables of classical physics

Even
Classical variables that do not change upon time reversal include:
, position of a particle in three-space
, acceleration of the particle
, force on the particle
, energy of the particle
, electric potential (voltage)
, electric field
, electric displacement
, density of electric charge
, electric polarization
Energy density of the electromagnetic field
, Maxwell stress tensor
All masses, charges, coupling constants, and other physical constants, except those associated with the weak force.

Odd
Classical variables that time reversal negates include:
, the time when an event occurs
, velocity of a particle
, linear momentum of a particle
, angular momentum of a particle (both orbital and spin)
, electromagnetic vector potential
, magnetic field
, magnetic auxiliary field
, density of electric current
, magnetization
, Poynting vector
, power (rate of work done).

Example: Magnetic Field and Onsager reciprocal relations
Let us consider the example of a system of charged particles subject to a constant external magnetic field: in this case the canonical time reversal operation that reverses the velocities and the time  and keeps the coordinates untouched is no more a symmetry for the system. However, there was proved that it is possible to find other time reversal operations which preserve the dynamics and so Onsager reciprocal relations; in conclusion, one cannot state that the presence of a magnetic field always breaks T-symmetry.

Microscopic phenomena: time reversal invariance

Most systems are asymmetric under time reversal, but there may be phenomena with symmetry. In classical mechanics, a velocity v reverses under the operation of T, but an acceleration does not. Therefore, one models dissipative phenomena through terms that are odd in v. However, delicate experiments in which known sources of dissipation are removed reveal that the laws of mechanics are time reversal invariant. Dissipation itself is originated in the second law of thermodynamics.

The motion of a charged body in a magnetic field, B involves the velocity through the Lorentz force term v×B, and might seem at first to be asymmetric under T.  A closer look assures us that B also changes sign under time reversal. This happens because a magnetic field is produced by an electric current, J, which reverses sign under T.  Thus, the motion of classical charged particles in electromagnetic fields is also time reversal invariant.  (Despite this, it is still useful to consider the time-reversal non-invariance in a local sense when the external field is held fixed, as when the magneto-optic effect is analyzed.  This allows one to analyze the conditions under which optical phenomena that locally break time-reversal, such as Faraday isolators and directional dichroism, can occur.)

In physics one separates the laws of motion, called kinematics, from the laws of force, called dynamics. Following the classical kinematics of Newton's laws of motion, the kinematics of quantum mechanics is built in such a way that it presupposes nothing about the time reversal symmetry of the dynamics. In other words, if the dynamics are invariant, then the kinematics will allow it to remain invariant; if the dynamics is not, then the kinematics will also show this. The structure of the quantum laws of motion are richer, and we examine these next.

Time reversal in quantum mechanics

This section contains a discussion of the three most important properties of time reversal in quantum mechanics; chiefly,
 that it must be represented as an anti-unitary operator,
 that it protects non-degenerate quantum states from having an electric dipole moment,
 that it has two-dimensional representations with the property  (for fermions).

The strangeness of this result is clear if one compares it with parity. If parity transforms a pair of quantum states into each other, then the sum and difference of these two basis states are states of good parity. Time reversal does not behave like this. It seems to violate the theorem that all abelian groups be represented by one-dimensional irreducible representations. The reason it does this is that it is represented by an anti-unitary operator. It thus opens the way to spinors in quantum mechanics.

On the other hand, the notion of quantum-mechanical time reversal turns out to be a useful tool for the development of physically motivated quantum computing and simulation settings, providing, at the same time, relatively simple tools to assess their complexity. For instance, quantum-mechanical time reversal was used to develop novel boson sampling schemes and to prove the duality between two fundamental optical operations, beam splitter and squeezing transformations.

Formal notation
In formal mathematical presentations of T-symmetry, three different kinds of notation for T need to be carefully distinguished: the T that is an involution, capturing the actual reversal of the time coordinate, the T that is an ordinary finite dimensional matrix, acting on spinors and vectors, and the T that is an operator on an infinite-dimensional Hilbert space.

For a real (not complex) classical (unquantized) scalar field , the time reversal involution can simply be written as

as time reversal leaves the scalar value at a fixed spacetime point unchanged, up to an overall sign . A slightly more formal way to write this is

which has the advantage of emphasizing that  is a map, and thus the "mapsto" notation  whereas  is a factual statement relating the old and new fields to one-another.

Unlike scalar fields, spinor and vector fields  might have a non-trivial behavior under time reversal.  In this case, one has to write

where  is just an ordinary matrix. For complex fields, complex conjugation may be required, for which the mapping   can be thought of as a 2x2 matrix. For a Dirac spinor,  cannot be written as a 4x4 matrix, because, in fact, complex conjugation is indeed required; however, it can be written as an 8x8 matrix, acting on the 8 real components of a Dirac spinor.

In general, one simply states that the equations must be time-reversal invariant, and then solves for the explicit value of  that achieves this goal. In some cases, generic arguments can be made. Thus, for example, for spinors in three-dimensional Euclidean space, or four-dimensional Minkowski space, an explicit transformation can be given. It is conventionally given as

This form follows whenever the spinor can be described with a linear differential equation that is first-order in the time derivative, which is generally the case in order for something to be validly called "a spinor".

The formal notation now makes it clear how to extend time-reversal to an arbitrary tensor field  In this case,

It acts on quantized fields  as

This can be thought of as a special case of a tensor with one covariant, and one contravariant index, and thus two 's are required.

All three of these symbols capture the idea of time-reversal; they differ with respect to the specific space that is being acted on: functions, vectors/spinors, or infinite-dimensional operators.

Anti-unitary representation of time reversal

Eugene Wigner showed that a symmetry operation S of a Hamiltonian is represented, in quantum mechanics either by a unitary operator, or an antiunitary one,  where U is unitary, and K denotes complex conjugation. These are the only operations that act on Hilbert space so as to preserve the length of the projection of any one state-vector onto another state-vector.

Consider the parity operator. Acting on the position, it reverses the directions of space, so that . Similarly, it reverses the direction of momentum, so that , where x and p are the position and momentum operators. This preserves the canonical commutator , where ħ is the reduced Planck constant, only if P is chosen to be unitary, .

On the other hand, the time reversal operator T, it does nothing to the x-operator, but it reverses the direction of p, so that . The canonical commutator is invariant only if T is chosen to be anti-unitary, i.e., .

Another argument involves energy, the time-component of the four-momentum. If time reversal were implemented as a unitary operator, it would reverse the sign of the energy just as space-reversal reverses the sign of the momentum. This is not possible, because, unlike momentum, energy is always positive. Since energy in quantum mechanics is defined as the phase factor exp(–iEt) that one gets when one moves forward in time, the way to reverse time while preserving the sign of the energy is to also reverse the sense of "i", so that the sense of phases is reversed.

Similarly, any operation that reverses the sense of phase, which changes the sign of i, will turn positive energies into negative energies unless it also changes the direction of time. So every antiunitary symmetry in a theory with positive energy must reverse the direction of time. Every antiunitary operator can be written as the product of the time reversal operator and a unitary operator that does not reverse time.

For a particle with spin J, one can use the representation

where Jy is the y-component of the spin, and use of  has been made.

Electric dipole moments

This has an interesting consequence on the electric dipole moment (EDM) of any particle. The EDM is defined through the shift in the energy of a state when it is put in an external electric field: , where d is called the EDM and δ, the induced dipole moment. One important property of an EDM is that the energy shift due to it changes sign under a parity transformation. However, since d is a vector, its expectation value in a state |ψ⟩ must be proportional to ⟨ψ| J |ψ⟩, that is the expected spin. Thus, under time reversal, an invariant state must have vanishing EDM. In other words, a non-vanishing EDM signals both P and T symmetry-breaking.

Some molecules, such as water, must have EDM irrespective of whether T is a symmetry. This is correct; if a quantum system has degenerate ground states that transform into each other under parity, then time reversal need not be broken to give EDM.

Experimentally observed bounds on the electric dipole moment of the nucleon currently set stringent limits on the violation of time reversal symmetry in the strong interactions, and their modern theory: quantum chromodynamics. Then, using the CPT invariance of a relativistic quantum field theory, this puts strong bounds on strong CP violation.

Experimental bounds on the electron electric dipole moment also place limits on theories of particle physics and their parameters.

Kramers' theorem

For T, which is an anti-unitary Z2 symmetry generator
 T2 = UKUK = UU* = U (UT)−1 = Φ,

where Φ is a diagonal matrix of phases.
U = Φ U Φ.

This means that the entries in Φ are ±1, as a result of which one may have either . This is specific to the anti-unitarity of T. For a unitary operator, such as the parity, any phase is allowed.

Next, take a Hamiltonian invariant under T. Let |a⟩ and T|a⟩ be two quantum states of the same energy. Now, if , then one finds that the states are orthogonal: a result called Kramers' theorem. This implies that if , then there is a twofold degeneracy in the state. This result in non-relativistic quantum mechanics presages the spin statistics theorem of quantum field theory.

Quantum states that give unitary representations of time reversal, i.e., have  , are characterized by a multiplicative quantum number, sometimes called the T-parity.

Time reversal of the known dynamical laws
Particle physics codified the basic laws of dynamics into the standard model. This is formulated as a quantum field theory that has CPT symmetry, i.e., the laws are invariant under simultaneous operation of time reversal, parity and charge conjugation. However, time reversal itself is seen not to be a symmetry (this is usually called CP violation). There are two possible origins of this asymmetry, one through the mixing of different flavours of quarks in their weak decays, the second through a direct CP violation in strong interactions. The first is seen in experiments, the second is strongly constrained by the non-observation of the EDM of a neutron.

Time reversal violation is unrelated to the second law of thermodynamics, because due to the conservation of the CPT symmetry, the effect of time reversal is to rename particles as antiparticles and vice versa. Thus the second law of thermodynamics is thought to originate in the initial conditions in the universe.

Time reversal of noninvasive measurements
Strong measurements (both classical and quantum) are certainly disturbing, causing asymmetry due to the second law of thermodynamics. However,
noninvasive measurements should not disturb the evolution, so they are expected to be time-symmetric. Surprisingly, it is true only in classical physics but not in quantum physics, even in a thermodynamically invariant equilibrium state. This type of asymmetry is independent of CPT symmetry but has not yet been confirmed experimentally due to extreme conditions of the checking proposal.

See also 
 Arrow of time
 Causality (physics)
 Computing applications
 Limits to computing
 Quantum computing
 Reversible computing
 Standard model
CKM matrix
CP violation
 CPT invariance
 Neutrino mass
Strong CP problem
 Wheeler–Feynman absorber theory
 Loschmidt's paradox
 Maxwell's demon
 Microscopic reversibility
 Second law of thermodynamics
 Time translation symmetry

References

Inline citations

General references
Maxwell's demon: entropy, information, computing, edited by H.S.Leff and A.F. Rex (IOP publishing, 1990) 
Maxwell's demon, 2: entropy, classical and quantum information, edited by H.S.Leff and A.F. Rex (IOP publishing, 2003) 
The emperor's new mind: concerning computers, minds, and the laws of physics, by Roger Penrose (Oxford university press, 2002) 

Multiferroic materials with time-reversal breaking optical properties 
CP violation, by I.I. Bigi and A.I. Sanda (Cambridge University Press, 2000) 
Particle Data Group on CP violation
the Babar experiment in SLAC
the BELLE experiment in KEK
the KTeV experiment in Fermilab
the CPLEAR experiment in CERN

Time in physics
Thermodynamics
Statistical mechanics
Philosophy of thermal and statistical physics
Quantum field theory
 Symmetry